Dolovi may refer to:

 Dolovi, Donji Vakuf, Bosnia and Herzegovina
 Dolovi (Konjic), Bosnia and Herzegovina
 Dolovi, Olovo, Bosnia and Herzegovina
 Dolovi (Trebinje), Bosnia and Herzegovina
 Dolovi, Velika Kladuša, Bosnia and Herzegovina
 Dolovi, Visoko, Bosnia and Herzegovina
 Dolovi, Danilovgrad, Montenegro